Paranerita carminata is a moth of the subfamily Arctiinae. It was described by William Schaus in 1905. It is found in French Guiana.

References

Paranerita
Moths described in 1905